Tichá is a municipality and village in Nový Jičín District in the Moravian-Silesian Region of the Czech Republic. It has about 1,900 inhabitants. It lies in the Moravian-Silesian Foothills.

History
The first written mention of Tichá is from 1359.

References

Villages in Nový Jičín District